Bubble Bobble Evolution is a game in the Bubble Bobble series for the PSP system.

Bub and Bob, the two main characters in the series, have been trapped in costumed versions of their bubble dragon forms (instead of physically into bubble dragons) and are separated into each of the two Towers of Entertainment. Bub and Bob must traverse the towers while defeating the various enemies inside it.

The game's levels are now in a cylindrical structure, and there are puzzles that must be completed to progress through the game, such as activating switches and moving items.

Reception

Bubble Bobble Evolution received "generally unfavorable reviews" according to the review aggregation website Metacritic. In Japan, Famitsu gave it a score of 24 out of 40.

References

External links
Bubble Bobble Evolution at PlayStation.com
 

2006 video games
Marvelous Entertainment games
Platform games
Taito games
PlayStation Portable games
PlayStation Portable-only games
Bubble Bobble
Rising Star Games games
Multiplayer and single-player video games
Video games developed in Japan